Enrique Orizaola Velázquez (26 March 1922 – 10 June 2013) was a Spanish
footballer and coach.

Playing career
Born in Santander, Orizaola played for Racing de Santander.

Coaching career
Orizaola coached Gimnástica Torrelavega, Racing de Santander, Real Jaén, Real Murcia, Barcelona, Osasuna, Real Oviedo, Levante, Deportivo, Real Valladolid, Rayo Vallecano, Sabadell, Albacete Balompié, Salamanca, CD Badajoz, Calvo Sotelo and Xerez CD. At the start of 1961, he took on charge as manager of FC Barcelona after Ljubiša Broćić's sacking and achieved the greatest result of his career: he reached the first European Cup final of the club's history, eventually losing to SL Benfica 3-2.

His son, Enrique Orizaola Paz, was the chairman of Córdoba CF.

References

1922 births
2013 deaths
Footballers from Cantabria
Spanish footballers
Association football midfielders
Segunda División players
Tercera División players
Racing de Santander players
Gimnástica de Torrelavega footballers
Spanish football managers
La Liga managers
Segunda División managers
Tercera División managers
Gimnástica de Torrelavega managers
Racing de Santander managers
Real Jaén managers
Real Murcia managers
FC Barcelona managers
CA Osasuna managers
Real Oviedo managers
Levante UD managers
Deportivo de La Coruña managers
Real Valladolid managers
UD Salamanca managers
Rayo Vallecano managers
CE Sabadell FC managers
Albacete Balompié managers
Xerez CD managers
CD Badajoz managers